Mame-Anna Diop (born February 6, 1988) is a Senegalese-American actress and model. Since 2018, she has portrayed Kory Anders on the DC Universe / HBO Max series Titans. Diop was also a series regular on The CW supernatural mystery The Messengers (2015) and the Fox thriller 24: Legacy (2017). In film, she appeared in Us (2019) and headlined Nanny (2022), for which she received widespread acclaim.

Biography
Diop was born in Senegal and moved to the United States at the age of six. She moved to New York at the age of 16 to pursue a career in acting and modeling. In 2006, she made her television debut in a recurring role on Everybody Hates Chris. In the following years, she guest starred on Lincoln Heights, Whitney, and Touch. Diop had a role in the 2013 film The Moment. In 2015, Diop starred as Rose Arvale in the short-lived supernatural drama series The Messengers. Later that year, she appeared in the thriller series Quantico and was cast in a recurring role on Oprah's drama series Greenleaf. In 2017, Diop was a series regular in the series 24: Legacy. In the DC Universe superhero series Titans (2018–), Diop plays the extraterrestrial princess and heroine Starfire. In 2018, Diop was cast in the horror film Us directed by Jordan Peele.

On October 16, 2022, Diop was given the Spotlight Award at the Newport Beach Film Festival.

Filmography

Film

Television

References

External links
 

Living people
People from Dakar
American television actresses
21st-century American actresses
Senegalese emigrants to the United States
1988 births
African-American actresses
Senegalese television actresses
21st-century African-American women
21st-century African-American people
20th-century African-American people
20th-century African-American women